Poştbinə (also, Poshtbina) is a village and municipality in the Balakan Rayon of Azerbaijan.  It has a population of 1,246.  The municipality consists of the villages of Poştbinə and Çorçorbinə.

References 

Populated places in Balakan District